Pryor's Place is an American children's television series that aired for one season in 1984 on CBS. The live-action series starred comedian Richard Pryor as himself.

Overview
Despite a reputation for profanity from Richard Pryor, Pryor's Place was aimed at children. Like Sesame Street, Pryor's Place featured a cast of puppets hanging out and having fun in a friendly inner-city environment, along with several children and characters portrayed by Pryor himself.

The theme song was performed by Ray Parker Jr. of Ghostbusters fame, who also appeared in the show's opening credits. The show was also fitted with a laugh track. An uncredited Rick Dees announced the commercial-bumpers for each show (although Dees announced the commercial-bumpers for CBS Saturday morning overall, Pryor's Place had its own bumpers).

Pryor's Place was broadcast on Saturdays on CBS (at 11:30 AM Eastern/10:30 AM Central) from September 15 to December 8, 1984, with repeats airing until June 15, 1985. It was replaced with reruns of another Krofft show, Land of the Lost. Four VHS videotapes were released between September 1997 and June 1998 by Rhino Entertainment, each containing one episode of the series.

Episodes

Cast
Richard Pryor as Himself
Akili Prince as Little Richie
Cliffy Magee as Wallace "Wally" Walker
Michael Sheehan as Puppeteer

Guest Stars

Kareem Abdul-Jabbar as himself (episode: "Too Old Too Soon, Too Smart Too Late")
Ron Cey as himself (episode: "Sax Education")
Scatman Crothers as Uncle Mose (episode: "Too Old Too Soon, Too Smart Too Late")
Sammy Davis Jr. as Smooth Sam (episode: "To Catch a Little Thief")
Kim Fields as Rita (episode: "Cousin Rita")
Shirley Hemphill as the Shopkeeper (episode: "Sax Education")
Pat McCormick as King Empty-Head (episode: "Voyage to the Planet of the Dumb")
Jeremy Miller (episode: "Sax Education")
Pat Morita as Joe (episode: "Voyage to the Planet of the Dumb")
John Ritter (episode: "The Showoff")
Rip Taylor (episode: "Sax Education")
Lily Tomlin (episode: "Cousin Rita")
Robin Williams as Gabby (episode: "Sax Education")
Henry Winkler as himself (episode: "Home Free")

Recurring Cast

Marla Gibbs as Ms. Stern (episodes: "Voyage to the Planet of the Dumb," "Kimosabe Blues," "Sax Education")
Danny Ponce as Charlie (episode: Voyage to the Planet of the Dumb)
Danny Nucci as Freddy (episode: Voyage to the Planet of the Dumb)
Angela Lee as Sheri (episode: Voyage to the Planet of the Dumb)
Patty Maloney as Dummy #1 (episode: Voyage to the Planet of the Dumb)
Jimmy Briscoe as Dummy #3 (episode: Voyage to the Planet of the Dumb)
Tony Cox as Allen/Dummy #2 (episode: Voyage to the Planet of the Dumb)
Spring Mooney as Denise (episode: Cousin Rita)
Lily Mariye as Lily (episode: Cousin Rita)
Regina Hooks as Regina (episode: Cousin Rita)
E. Hampton Beagle as Anything Shop Owner (episode: To Catch a Little Thief)
Milt Kogan as Solly (episode: To Catch a Little Thief and episode: High Noon at 5:30 p.m.)
Stephen Rumph as Jake (episode: To Catch a Little Thief)
Chez Lister as J.D. (episode: To Catch a Little Thief)
Carol Lipin as Woman in Prison (episode: To Catch a Little Thief)
Keland Love as Meatrack (episode: High Noon at 5:30 p.m.)
Elliot Sarkin as Ronny Chung (episode: High Noon at 5:30 p.m.)
Scooter Stevens as Kid #1 (episode: High Noon at 5:30 p.m.)/Sid (episode: Kimosabe Blues)
Leanne Richelle as Patty (episode: Kimosabe Blues)
Sean Garrett McFrazier as Marty (episode: Kimosabe Blues)

References

External links
 
 Pryor's Place at Toonarific Cartoons
 Writer Mark Evanier on working on the show

Richard Pryor
1984 American television series debuts
1984 American television series endings
1980s American children's comedy television series
American children's education television series
American television shows featuring puppetry
CBS original programming
English-language television shows
Television series by Sony Pictures Television
Television series by Sid and Marty Krofft Television Productions